Angels is a British television seasonal drama series dealing with the subject of student nurses and was broadcast by the BBC between 1975 and 1983 and was once described as the "Z-Cars of nursing".

The show's format switched to a twice-weekly soap opera format (although still seasonal) from 1979 to 1983.

Background and creators
The show's title derived from the name of the hospital where the series was originally set—St. Angela's, Battersea—although in the early 1980s the scenario changed to Heath Green Hospital, Birmingham. The series was devised by Paula Milne. Early producers included Morris Barry and Ron Craddock. The first episode was directed by Julia Smith who became the show's producer in 1979. Her script editor on the later series was Tony Holland. Filming took place at the now demolished St James' Hospital, Balham, London. Location filming for the fictional Heath Green Hospital took place at Walsgrave Hospital in Coventry, which has been demolished and replaced on the same site by University Hospital Coventry.

Julia Smith enlisted Tony Holland as Angels script editor after the show became a twice-weekly soap. Smith and Holland went on to create EastEnders in the 1980s. Writers on its first series included Jill Hyem and Anne Valery – who both later co-wrote Tenko – and Adele Rose.

Actors
The series provided valuable early TV exposure for a variety of young actresses who became better known on British TV, including Fiona Fullerton, Érin Geraghty, Lesley Dunlop, Julie Dawn Cole, Angela Bruce, Clare Clifford and Pauline Quirke. Additionally, Kathryn Apanowicz, Shirley Cheriton and Judith Jacob all later appeared in EastEnders, with Cheriton playing the particularly prominent role of Debbie Wilkins. Mamta Kaash played a key role in the hospital drama Casualty.

Theme music
The guitar-driven theme tune, reminiscent of American police dramas of the time, was called Motivation, and was composed and performed by Alan Parker.

Critical reception
Angels, in its 1979 to 1983 weekly soap format, tackled issues such as contraception, alcoholism and promiscuity as part of the nurses' lives. Angels received criticism for its unglamorous depiction of the nursing profession, but Smith defended the programme, arguing the need to address such subjects in the series. Indeed, with its sometimes hard-hitting portrayal of young nurses facing up to the demands of the profession, Angels, particularly in its soap format days of 1979 to 1983, was grittily authentic. To this end, each actor taking a part was required to work on a real hospital ward to gain experience and thus contribute to the realism of the series.

Cast

Novels
Some TV tie-in novels were published to coincide with the series.
 Angels by Paula Milne & Leslie Duxbury, Pan Books/BBC Books, 1975.
 Flights of Angels by Paula Milne, Pan Books/BBC Books, 1976. Includes novelisations of the Season 2 episodes Vocation and Walkabout.
 New Angels by Paula Milne, BBC Books, 1978.
 Angel Katy by Leah Harrow, Dragon Books, 1979.

Home media
On 18 March 2013 Simply Media released the Series 1 (fifteen episodes) of Angels on DVD. Series 2 was released in September 2014.

Canceled reboot
According to a 2019 interview with Julie Dawn Cole, the show was slated for a reboot sometime after its initial run. While not much about this reboot is known, Cole stated that the theme of the show was to have new characters in the same fictional setting of Saint Angela's Hospital, who were less “wholesome” than the characters from the original series. The working title for this reboot was Angels With Dirty Faces. Ultimately the reboot never materialised.

References

External links

 British Film Institute Screen Online

1975 British television series debuts
1983 British television series endings
1970s British medical television series
1970s British television soap operas
1970s British workplace television series
1980s British medical television series
1980s British television soap operas
1980s British workplace television series
BBC television dramas
English-language television shows
Television shows set in England
Television shows set in London